Bieke Kindt (born ) is a Belgian female volleyball player. She is part of the Belgium women's national volleyball team.

She competed at the 2015 FIVB Volleyball Girls' U18 World Championship, and 2018 FIVB Volleyball Women's Nations League. 
On club level she plays for VC Oudegem.

References

External links 

 FIVB profile
 CEV profile
 http://www.scoresway.com/?sport=volleyball&page=player&id=13691
 http://www.fivb.org/vis_web/volley/GU182015/GU182015_p3-036.pdf

2000 births
Living people
Belgian women's volleyball players
Place of birth missing (living people)
21st-century Belgian women